The northern spadefoot toad (Notaden melanoscaphus)  is a species of frog in the family Limnodynastidae.

It is endemic to Australia.
Its natural habitats are dry savanna, moist savanna, subtropical or tropical dry lowland grassland, swamps, and intermittent freshwater marshes.

References

Notaden
Amphibians of Western Australia
Amphibians of the Northern Territory
Amphibians of Queensland
Amphibians described in 1962
Taxonomy articles created by Polbot
Frogs of Australia
Taxa named by William Hosmer (herpetologist)